Canal+ Family was a French TV channel devoted to the broadcast of family programming. It is part of the "Les Chaînes Canal+" and the "Famille" package from Canal+.

Canal+ Family had an African version, on channel 6 from Canal+ Afrique.

History
Canal+ Family was launched on 27 October 2007 as a complement to Canal+.

The channel began broadcasting in High Definition (HD) on 12 October 2010.

In October 2010, Canal+ SA applied to the CSA to obtain a frequency for the channel on the TNT but this application was rejected on 14 December in favor of the string CFoot.

On 30 August 2021, Canal+ Family closed in Metropolitan France, to be replaced by Canal+ Kids and Canal+ Docs on 9 September, focusing on on-demand content. However, Canal+ Family continued to broadcast in Overseas France until 9 September when it was also replaced by Canal+ Kids.

Organisation
Leadership
President and CEO of Canal+ SA: Bertrand Méheut

Director-General of programming: Rodolphe Belmer

Capital
Canal+ Family was published by Canal+ with a capital of 100,000,000 euros. It is 48.48% owned by Canal+ France, 6.17% from Amber Master Fund, 5.05% by the group Pathé, 4.92% by the Credit Suisse First Boston, 4.32% by Rothschild, 1.87% by Richelieu Finance, 1.08% by the Fund Deposit. The other shares are owned by the public.

Programming
The programming of Canal + Family consisted of family-oriented films, documentaries, series, and cartoons. Canal + Family does not broadcast advertising.

Final programming
 Chi's Sweet Home
 Gribouille
 Grosha & Mr B.
 I, Elvis Riboldi
 Kaeloo
 Les cahiers d'Esther
 Little Vampire
 Mush-Mush & the Mushables
 Petit Poilu
 Sardine de l'espace
 Sweet Little Monsters
 The Crumpets
 The Treehouse Stories
 Total DramaRama

Former programming

 Action Dad (2012)
 Agent Carter
 Almost Naked Animals (2011)
 Animaniacs
 Arrow (season 1-2)
 Bolts and Blip (2010)
 Camp Lakebottom (2013)
 Charlie's Angels (2011)
 Chicken Town 
 Cloud Bread
 Copy Cut (2013)
 Cracked (2016)
 Daniel Tiger's Neighborhood
 Dance Academy
 Doodleboo (2015)
 Dragon Hunters
 Endangered Species
 Gasp!
 Gaspard and Lisa (2017)
 Gawayn
 Go On, Tell Me A Story!
 Gorg and Lala
 H
 Heartland
 Hubert and Takako (2013)
 Insectibles
 Jamie's Got Tentacles
 Justice League
 Kika and Bob
 Kofiko
 La cabane à histoires
 League of Super Evil
 Life Unexpected
 Ma petite séance
 Merlin
 Miru Miru (2016)
 Molang (2015)
 Monk Little Dog
 Monster Buster Club
 Monster Math Squad
 My Knight and Me (2017)
 My Life Me
 Nerds and Monsters
 Ninoo's Speaking (2013)
 Numb Chucks
 Oddbods (2016)
 Oggy and the Cockroaches (Season 3, in 2008)
 Peg + Cat
 Petit Vampire
 Pok & Mok
 Polo
 Pushing Daisies
 Raising Hope
 Raymond
 Revenge
 Rocket Monkeys
 Sarah and Duck
 Samurai Girl
 Shazzam Super 2000
 Spy
 Stella and Sam (2012)
 Stellina
 Stoked
 Suburgatory
 Sweet Little Monsters
 Tangerine & Cow
 The Daltons
 The Day Henry Met..? (2016)
 The Fridge
 The Long Long Holiday
 The New Addams Family
 The Raccoons
 The Simpsons
 The Vampire Diaries (season 1-2)
 The Wacky World of Tex Avery
 The Wakos
 The ZhuZhus
 Tinga Tinga Tales
 Tom and Jerry Kids
 Total Drama Action
 Total Drama: All-Stars (2014)
 Total Drama Island
 Total Drama: Pahkitew Island
 Total Drama: Revenge of the Island
 Total Drama World Tour
 Trolls of Troy (2013)
 Trust Me, I'm a Genie!
 Two and a Half Men
 Wayside
 Welcome to Bric-A-Broc
 Wibbly Pig
 Wishfart
 Zig and Sharko (2010-2015)
 Zoobabu (2012)

Distribution
Canal+ Family was available on satellite (Canalsat), cable (Numericable) and several broadcasters ADSL.

See also
 Canal+
 Canal+ Séries
 Canal+ Cinéma
 Canal+ Sport
 Canal+ Décalé

References

External links
 Canal Plus
 Grille des programmes des chaînes de CANAL+

Television stations in France
Family
Television channels and stations established in 2007
Defunct television channels in France
Television channels and stations disestablished in 2021
2007 establishments in France
2021 disestablishments in France